Veer Lorik is part of the Bhojpuri folklore of Bihar and eastern Uttar Pradesh, India. According to S.M. Pandey, it is considered to be the Ramayana by the Ahir. Veer Lorik is a divine character of the legend of the Ahir of eastern Uttar Pradesh. The Veer Lorik Stone on the banks of the Son River in the Sonbhadra, Uttar Pradesh, contains a love story. He is sometimes known as the Lorikayan, after the folkloric tale of that name.

Story
During the 5th century, there was a state called Agori along the Son River (now located in Sonbhadra district). Molagat, the ruling king of the state, despite being a very good king, was jealous of a Yadav man named Mehra because of the power he wielded. One day King Molagat invited Mehra to a gambling match. It was proposed that the winner of the gambling game will rule over the state. Mehra accepted the king's proposal and they began gambling. The king lost everything and had to leave his kingdom. Seeing the plight of the king, Lord Brahma came as a disguised monk and gave him some coins, assuring him that once he plays a game with those coins, his rule would return. The king obeyed, and won. Mehra lost six times and gambled everything away, including his wife, who was pregnant. In the seventh time, he lost his wife's womb as well. But the king seemed to show generosity towards Mehra. He said that if the upcoming baby is a boy then he will work in the stables and if it is girl, she will be appointed in the service of the Queen.

Mehra's seventh child was born as a girl, and named Manjari. When the King discovered this, he sent soldiers to bring Manjari to him. But Manjari's mother refused to part with her  daughter. Instead, she sent a message to the king that he would have to kill Manjari's husband if he wanted to take her with him.

Hence, Manjari's parents were anxious to find a suitor for Manjari who could defeat the king after the wedding. Manjari asked her parents to go to the place of the people named Balia where they will find a youngster named Yadav Veer Lorik. He was her lover in a previous life, and also capable of defeating the king.

Manjari and Lorik's fathers met and the marriage gets fixed. Lorik comes over with half a million people for the wedding, to marry Manjari. 
When they reached the bank of the river son, the king sent his troops to fight Lorik and capture Manjari.
Lorik seemed to be defeated in the war. Manjari, being an extraordinary girl, goes to Veer Lorik and tells him that there is a village named Gothani near the Agori Fort . She tells him that there is a temple of Lord Shiva in that village and if he goes there and prays to the god, victory will be his.

Lorik does what Manjari said and wins the war so the both married each other. Before leaving the threshold of the village, Manjari tells Lorik to do something great so that the people remember that they loved each other to such an extent.
Veer Lorik asked Manjari that what must he do so that it becomes a symbol of true love and no loving couple would ever return disappointed from here.
Manjari, pointing at a stone, asked Lorik to cut the stone with the same sword he used to kill the King. Lorik did the same, the stone got cut in two pieces. Manjari applied vermilion to her head from a fragmented rock and made the Veer Lorik Stone as Sign of true love, to stand there forever.

SM Pandey called it the national epic of the Ahirs.

Veer Lorik Stone

Veer Lorik Stone, also known in Hindi as Veer Lorik Patthar (English veer;brave, patthar;stone), is situated around 5 km from Robertsganj on Markundi Hill, in the northern Indian state of Uttar Pradesh. It is a symbol of love and bravery of Lorik and Manjari, the main characters of the local folklore ‘Loriki’. According to the folk tale, Yadav Veer Lorik cut this stone, using his sword, in a single stroke, as proof of his true love. Several folk songs, sung by native folksingers, are based on Loriki. Govardhan Puja, a Hindu festival, is celebrated here every year.

During Govardhan Puja, many couples come here to pray for everlasting love, like that of Veer Lorik and Manjari.

Near By 
Son View Point
Salkhan Fossils Park

Legacy
 Veer Lorik Statue, Bandihuli, Baheri (Darbhanga)
 In 1970, a caste-based militia named "Lorik Sena" was also established in Lorik's name and operated in Bihar.
Veer Ahir, a 1924 Indian silent film directed by Homi Master.

See also
 Alha-Khand
 Agori Fort
 Sonbhadra

References

Further reading 
 Grierson, George A. “The Birth of Lōrik (Magahi Text).” Bulletin of the School of Oriental Studies, University of London, vol. 5, no. 3, 1929, pp. 591–599. JSTOR, www.jstor.org/stable/607355. Accessed 8 Jan. 2021.

Ahir
Ahir history
Indian folklore
Sonbhadra district
Uttar Pradesh folklore
Indian legends
Indian legendary characters
Indian literature
Bhojpuri-language culture
Bihari Ahirs
Medieval Indian literature